Rokko Junior and Senior High School is a private Catholic secondary school for boys located in Kobe City,  Hyōgo Prefecture, Japan. Founded by the Jesuits in 1937, it was the first  Jesuit secondary school in Japan. The school offers an integrated middle and high school education for boys and does not recruit at the high school level.

Academics and activities 
Total enrollment is approximately 1,100 students.

There is no examination for admission to high school except to fill vacancies. While all English classes aim at entrance to Kyoto University, students can choose from three levels of mathematics education.

See also

 Education in Kobe
 List of Jesuit schools

References  

Jesuit secondary schools in Japan
Educational institutions established in 1937
1937 establishments in Japan
Schools in Hyōgo Prefecture
Education in Kobe